Footgolf is a sport in which players kick a football into a cup in as few shots as possible. The name is a portmanteau of association football and golf, and the game combines the two sports, being more closely related to golf.

Rules 
The game is played similarly to golf, with the exception that players use a football instead of a golf ball, and the ball is kicked rather than struck with a club, working toward a 50 cm-52 cm diameter by 28 cm deep "footgolf cup" usually located away from golf greens. The player who finishes the course with the fewest shots wins. Footgolf is often played on golf courses, though it may also be played on specially built courses. The first shot has to be played from a tee box, and bunkers, trees, water and hills must be crossed or avoided in order to reach the hole.

The game is played with a regulation No. 5 football. As footballs cannot be propelled as far as golf balls in one shot, footgolf is played on holes shorter than those used in golf. For instance, one course in California features holes that average 157 yards. Pars are typically five shots or fewer. Compared to golf, footgolf is quicker to play, more accessible, and does not require expensive equipment.

The official rules were established by the Federation for International FootGolf (FIFG) in 2013.

Origins 
A game with roughly similar rules, codeball, attained brief popularity in the United States during the late 1920s and 1930s. The sport of footgolf as we know it today (including attire, etiquette and general rules) was created in the Netherlands by Bas Korsten and Michael Jansen in 2008. Loosely basing it on a post-training game played by Korsten's brother - pro-footballer Willem Korsten - during his time at British football club Tottenham Hotspur (1999-2001). Players would end training sessions by kicking the footballs from the training pitch back to the changing rooms in as few kicks as possible. To officially launch this new sport - where playing on a regulation golf course is fundamental - Korsten, Jansen and a team of colleagues set up a national and international bond and organised the first tournament (Nederlandse Kampioenschap FootGolf) at prestigious Golfbaan Het Rijk van Nijmegen on 6 September 2009. This tournament, later televised on RTL7, was played by Dutch professional and ex-professional footballers and won by Theo Janssen.

Organized play 

The first ever footgolf tournament was organized in the Netherlands by Michael Jansen and Bas Korsten, and played by a mix of Dutch and Belgian professional footballers. After this, many countries began to organize matches, events, tournaments, even national leagues and associations around this game.

Later, Belgium and Hungary switched from playing in parks to golf courses, and the game was introduced to Argentina in 2010. American FootGolf League, the major league of footgolf in the United States, was founded in 2011. The game was internationally publicized, and countries worldwide started collaborating on the development of the game. By 2014, the game was offered at hundreds of courses in the United States and was in the final stages of being recognized by Sport England.

In December 2015, the Swedish Golf Federation, a member of the highest sporting authority in Sweden (the Swedish Sports Confederation), by a formal two-part voting, accepted and approved footgolf as an official sport (eligible for recognition in national championships, future inclusion in the Olympic Games, etc).

The game's emergence coincided with the decline of the popularity of golf among young people, with 643 courses closing between 2006 and 2014 in the United States. The sport has saved many struggling golf courses, and the Professional Golfers' Association of America and World Golf Foundation have both acknowledged footgolf's contribution to helping golf courses generate more income, and noted that it may contribute to the growth of golf itself. Former PGA president Ted Bishop said in 2014 that "I think it would be ludicrous to think there won't be a percentage of those people that might say, 'Hey, you know what? I think I'd like to try and play golf. In March 2016, the LPGA golfer Paula Creamer said "Anytime you can do something differently in the game of golf, it's fun and I think we'll probably be out there (playing FootGolf) a little bit more now." By 2020, the State Games of America and the USA Masters Games have included the sport of footgolf in their official competitions.

A group of countries combined to form the Federation for International FootGolf (FIFG) in June 2012, and eight countries played the first FootGolf World Cup in Hungary that month (won by Hungarian, Bela Lengyel). In January 2016, the second FootGolf World Cup was held in Argentina and 230 players from 26 FIFG member countries participated. The winner of the individual event was Argentinian player, Christian Otero and the team champion was Team USA. The third FootGolf World Cup was held in December 2018, in Marrakech, Morocco. The men's individual champion was Matias Perrone from Argentina and the women's individual champion was Sophie Brown from the United Kingdom. France won the gold in team competition, Team UK finished second and the previous world champion Team USA finished in third.

In the spring of 2015, the National Golf Courses Owners Association (NGCOA) recognized the American FootGolf League (AFGL) as the governing body for the sport of footgolf in the U.S., and a few months later, Roberto Balestrini, founder of footgolf in North America was selected by Golf Inc Magazine as one of "The Ten Most Innovative People in Golf". On 2 October 2017, the GAISF (Global Association of International Sports Federations) granted observer status to the Federation for International FootGolf (FIFG).

Attire 

The dress code for competition states a "classic golf style uniform with wearing indoor or turf football shoes" for tournament play, and notes that most golf courses have a dress code for golfers, which footgolf players would also have to follow.

The Dress Code of the Major League of FootGolf in the United States (AFGL Tour) is basically golf style, knee-high football socks and turf football shoes.

Players 

Ben Clarke is deemed the best player in the world in singles format of the genre Ref FIFA. Matías Perrone is also regarded as one of the all-time best footgolf players worldwide. UK, Argentina, USA and France tend to be seen as the biggest challengers in the National Teams competition followed by Italy, Slovakia and Netherlands.

Buschball 
Buschball is a variation invented in Germany.

Rules 
The aim of the game is to hit the pole with as few shots as possible. The pole is a flag pole. Both the pole as well as the flag are part of the target.

First the order of the players is drawn. The first player sets the pole for the first round, the second player begins the round by trying to hit the pole with as few kicks as possible. Once everyone has had a turn the second player places the pole and the third player starts the round etc.

Every player has a maximum of nine attempts to hit the pole. If after these nine attempts he fails to hit the pole ten points are recorded for that particular player and it is the following player's turn. At the end of the round the player with the fewest kicks is awarded a best round.

The first set is completed once everyone has had a turn to place the pole. The players can decide how many sets they wish to play. The winner is the person who at the end of the last set has the fewest kicks. In the case of a draw the number of best rounds decides.
Note: While playing, no-one is allowed to touch the ball while it is still moving. Before a shot, any loose object behind the ball (sticks, stones, etc.) can be removed to ensure safety. Any object in front of the ball may not be removed.

History 
The oldest known version of buschball was played in 1977. Due to a lack of players for a standard game of football Andreas Oligmüller and his friends decided to shoot at trees and road signs. After a while that became too easy so they decided to aim at trees hidden behind bushes. The first variant of the game was born.

Players and clubs 
The number of players and clubs is constantly growing. In 2008, 35 people played buschball and in 2009 the sport had managed to attract 150 players.

See also
 Codeball

References

External links 
 Federation for International FootGolf (FIFG)
 FootGolf Association of Wales (FGAW)
 FootGolf Association of England (FGAoE)
 FootGolf Association of Scotland (FGAoS)
 FootGolf Union of Ireland (FGUI)
 National FootGolf Club League (NFCL)

Precision sports
Ball games
Association football variants
Forms of golf